World Universities are ranked by several organizations. This is a comparative list of some rankings published during 2021–2023. Included are the universities which are ranked in the top 1000 by at least one of the following:
 QS World University Rankings: 2023
 Academic Ranking of World Universities (ARWU or Shanghai Ranking): 2021
 Times Higher Education World University Rankings (THE): 2022
 U.S. News & World Report (USNWR): 2022

References
Notes

Works cited

References

University and college rankings
Lists of universities and colleges